At Home We Are Tourists is the debut album by American indie rock band Settle. It was released in May 2009 on Epitaph Records.

Track list 
 "Grand Marshall's Mooncloth Robes" – 4:12
 "Naked at a Family Function" – 3:46
 "Rite of Passage" – 3:20
 "ISO:: 40yr M w/Kids Seeks 26yr F w/o Kids" – 4:06
 "Affinity for My Hometown" – 2:40
 "I Saw an Inferno Once" – 3:04
 "Murder" – 3:22
 "Sunday, Morning After" – 2:54
 "On the Prowl" – 3:26
 "Kick. Win!" – 3:05
 "Dance Rock Is the New Pasture" – 3:14
 "Into the Mind of Those Who Commit Desperate Acts While Under the Influence of Others" – 4:15

References 

Settle (band) albums
2009 debut albums
Epitaph Records albums
Albums produced by Adam Lasus